This article is about music-related events in 1869.

Events 
February 28 – The premiere of Brahms' Rinaldo took place in Vienna at a concert of the Akademischer Gesangverein. The composer conducted, with the tenor Gustav Walter, a student chorus numbering 300, and the Court Opera orchestra. 
 April 3 – Edvard Grieg's Piano Concerto is premiered at Copenhagen's Casino.
 May 25 – The Vienna State Opera is inaugurated with a performance of Mozart's Don Giovanni.
 September 22 – Richard Wagner's opera Das Rheingold debuts at the Königlich Hof- und Nationaltheater in Munich.
 Approximate date – Start of "golden age" of flamenco.
Tchaikovsky completes the  initial version of Romeo and Juliet. It will be revised the next year and in 1880.

Published popular music 
 "The Little Brown Jug" by J. Eastburn Winner
 "Now the Day is Over" w. Sabine Baring-Gould m. Joseph Barnby
 "Shoo Fly, Don't Bother Me" attributed to T. Brigham Bishop (possibly w. Billy Reeves m. Frank Campbell)
 "Sweet Genevieve" w. George Cooper m. Henry Tucker

Classical music 
Mili Balakirev – Islamey an "Oriental Fantasy" for piano.
Johannes Brahms
Ein deutsches Requiem
Hungarian Dances
Anton Bruckner 
Mitternacht, WAB 80
Symphony in D minor ("Die Nullte")
Teresa Carreño – Un bal en rêve, Op.26
Henri Duparc 
Feuilles volantes, Op.1
Soupir
Louis Moreau Gottschalk – Grande fantaisie triomphale sur l'hymne national brésilien, Op.69
Louis James Alfred Lefébure-Wély – Vade-mecum de l'organiste, Op. 187
Heinrich Lichner – Figurinen, Op.57
Joachim Raff – Fantaisie, Op.142
Camille Saint-Saëns 
Orient et occident, Op. 25
La coccinelle
Paraphrase sur Mandolinata de Paladilhe
George Stephanescu – Symphony in A
Pyotr Ilyich Tchaikovsky  –  Six Romances, Op. 6 including None but the lonely heart

Opera 
Frederic Clay – Ages Ago
Karel Miry – Een engel op wacht (opera in 1 act, libretto by P. Geiregat, premiered on December 8 in Brussels)
Richard Wagner – Das Rheingold

Births 
 January 20 – George Hamlin, American opera singer (d. 1923)
February 1 – Kerry Mills, American violinist and songwriter (d. 1948)
February 3 – Giulio Gatti-Casazza, opera manager (d. 1940)
February 12 – Theodor Bertram, German opera singer (d.1907) 
 March 3 – Henry Wood, conductor (d. 1944)
 May 5 – Hans Pfitzner, composer (d. 1949)
 June 6 – Siegfried Wagner, composer (d. 1930)
 July 9 – Arnold Volpe, composer (d. 1940)
 July 13 – Florence Perry, opera singer (d. 1949)
 August 14 – Armas Järnefelt, Finnish composer and conductor (d. 1958)
 September 2 – Carlos Hartling, composer of the national anthem of Honduras (d. 1920)
 September 6 – Walford Davies, British composer and organist, Master of the King's Musick (d. 1941)
 September 21 – Henryk Melcer-Szczawiński, Polish composer, pianist, conductor, and teacher (d. 1928)
 September 30 – E. A. Couturier, American cornet virtuoso, composer, inventor and instrument manufacturer (d. 1950)
 October 8 (September 26 O.S.) – Komitas, born Soghomon Soghomonian, Turkish Armenian priest and ethnomusicologist (d. 1935)
date unknown
Kate Carney, born Catherine Pattinson, English music hall singer (d. 1950)
Maximilian Maksakov, born Max Schwartz, Austro-Russian operatic baritone (d. 1936)

Deaths 
January 10 – Joan Aulí, organist and composer (b. 1796)
January 17 – Alexander Dargomyzhsky, Russian composer (b. 1813)
January 30 – Charlotte Alington Barnard ('Claribel'), English ballad composer (b. 1830)
March 8 – Hector Berlioz, composer (b. 1803)
March 23 – Charles Lucas, cellist (b. 1808)
April 1 – Alexander Dreyschock, pianist and composer (b. 1818)
April 12 – Antonie Brentano, friend of Beethoven (b. 1780)
April 15 – August Wilhelm Bach, German composer and organist (b. 1796)
April 20 – Carl Loewe, composer, baritone, conductor (b. 1796)
May 10 – Bernhard Molique, German violinist and composer (b. 1802)
June 4 – Joseph Ascher, pianist and composer (b. 1829)
June 15 – Albert Grisar, composer (b. 1808)
July 18 –  Louis Bouilhet, lyricist (born 1822)
August 13 – Giuseppe Persiani, opera composer (b. 1799)
August 24 – Macedonio Alcalá, pianist, violinist and songwriter (b. 1831)
November 29 – Giulia Grisi, opera singer (b. 1811)
December 18 – Louis Moreau Gottschalk, composer and pianist (b. 1829) (overdose of quinine)
December 23 – Julian Fontana, pianist (b. 1810)
December 31 – Louis James Alfred Lefébure-Wély, organist (b. 1817)

References

 
19th century in music
Music by year